Hannes Tretter (born 5 July 1951 in Vienna) is an Austrian lawyer and human rights expert. He is Professor of Human Rights at the University of Vienna and Director of the Ludwig Boltzmann Institut für Menschenrechte, which he cofounded with Felix Ermacora and Manfred Nowak in 1992. He is also an expert with the Organization for Security and Co-operation in Europe, a board member of the Austrian League for Human Rights and chairs the Steering Committee of the Austrian EUMC Focal Point.

He earned his doctorate in law in 1975, and has been employed at the University of Vienna since 1978.

References

1951 births
Living people
Austrian human rights activists
20th-century Austrian lawyers
University of Vienna alumni
Academic staff of the University of Vienna
21st-century Austrian lawyers